The 1996 FIBA Africa Basketball Club Championship (15th edition), is an international basketball tournament  held in Alexandria, Egypt. The tournament was contested by 4 clubs in a round robin system.
 
The tournament was won by Gezira SC from Egypt, thus retaining the title.

Participating teams

Squads

Preliminary rounds

Final round

Day 1

Day 2

Day 3

Day 4

Day 5

Final standings

All Tournament Team

See also 
1997 FIBA Africa Championship

References

External links 
 FIBA Africa official website
 1996 FIBA Africa Champions Cup official website

1996
1996 in African basketball
1996 in Egyptian sport
International basketball competitions hosted by Egypt